Qeshlaq (also Romanized as Qeshlāq; also known as Gheshlagh and Qeshlāg) is a village in Sofla Rural District, in the Central District of Kharameh County, Fars Province, Iran. At the 2006 census, its population was 188, in 46 families.

References 

Populated places in Kharameh County